The John S. Toof House is a historic townhouse in Memphis, Tennessee, USA.

History
The three-story townhouse was built for John S. Toof in 1875. It was designed by architect Matthias Harvey Baldwin in the Italianate style.

It has been listed on the National Register of Historic Places since March 25, 1982.

References

Houses on the National Register of Historic Places in Tennessee
Italianate architecture in Tennessee
Houses completed in 1875
Houses in Memphis, Tennessee
National Register of Historic Places in Memphis, Tennessee